The Diocese of Pudentiana  is a suppressed and titular see of the Roman Catholic Church. It was centered on the Roman town of Pudentiana that flourished in the province of Numidia, Roman North Africa, through the Vandal Kingdom and Roman Empire of late antiquity.

History
At the Conference of Carthage of 411, which saw the Catholic and Donatists of Roman North Africa debate together. The records of the Council of Carthage show that the town was represented by the Donatist Cresconius, who reported that there was no Catholic bishop in his diocese. The proceedings of the conference tell, however, that Auronio of Macomades, who was a fervent Catholic, answered Cresconius saying that Pudenziana had a Catholic bishop named Memmiano and that he had succeeded  another bishop with the same name, but that both were now dead. Auronio of Macomades also accused Cresconi of having destroyed four Catholic basilicas.

Peregrino participated in the synod assembled in Carthage in 484 by the Vandal King Huneric, after which Peregrino was exiled.

In 591, Gregory the Great ordered Bishop Colombo of Nicives to convene a council to judge the work of Massimiano of Pudenziana, accused by his deacons of being bribed by donatists.

The diocese lasted till the Muslim conquest of the Maghreb. Today Pudenziana survives as a titular bishopric. Two holders of the titular see have become cardinals: Mario Casariego y Acevedo and Óscar Rodríguez Maradiaga and the most recent bishop was György Snell, auxiliary bishop of Esztergom-Budapest.

Bishops
Robert, Cardinal Titular of St. Pudentiana, (d.1294)
Mario Casariego y Acevedo (1958–1963)
Victor Garaygordóbil Berrizbeitia (1963–1978) 
Óscar Rodríguez Maradiaga, (1978–1993), Archbishop of Tegucigalpa 
Peter William Ingham (1993–2001), Bishop of Wollongong 
Sérgio Aparecido Colombo (2001– 2003),  
László Kiss-Rigó (2004–2006),
Shelton Fabre (2006–2013)  
György Snell (20 Oct 2014 – 26 February 2021)
Carlos Godoy Labraña (22 June 2021).

References

Catholic titular sees in Africa